Janak Kotak is the former mayor of Rajkot, a city in the Indian state of Gujarat. He is a member of the Bharatiya Janata Party. He is mayor since December 2010.

References

People from Rajkot
Mayors of places in Gujarat
Ahmedabad municipal councillors
Living people
Year of birth missing (living people)
Bharatiya Janata Party politicians from Gujarat